Gemini, Her Majesty is the 7th studio album released by the Rx Bandits released on July 22, 2014 through MDB Records. The album was preceded by two singles, "Stargazer" and "Meow! Meow! Space Tiger". For this record, the band were less concerned about replicating their on-stage sound, as guitarist Steve Choi explained: "The main difference is that this time around, we didn't write with being live in mind". This album peaked #39 on the Billboard 200, but was only on chart for a week.

Track listing

References

Rx Bandits albums
2014 albums